The Carolina Diamonds, formerly known as the NPF Diamonds, Tennessee Diamonds, Rockford Thunder and Texas Thunder, was a women's softball team based in Charlotte, North Carolina. Since the 2004 season, they have played as a member of National Pro Fastpitch (NPF). They were known as the Texas Thunder from 2004 to 2006, the Rockford Thunder from 2007 to 2009, and the Tennessee Diamonds in 2010. They relocated to Charlotte, North Carolina in 2012.

The Thunder won the 2009 Cowles Cup Championship of NPF by defeating the USSSA Pride in the championship game held in Akron, Ohio on August 23, 2009.

In February 2013, it was announced that the team had folded and the roster would now be picked up by the NPF expansion team, the New York/New Jersey Comets.

2012 roster

Season-by-season results

2011 roster

References

External links 
 Official Diamonds website
 

 
  
  
 
  

Softball teams
2004 establishments in Texas
2013 disestablishments in North Carolina
Sports clubs established in 2004
Sports clubs disestablished in 2013
Sports teams in Charlotte, North Carolina
Sports in Nashville, Tennessee
Sports teams in Tennessee
Defunct softball teams in the United States
Defunct National Pro Fastpitch teams
Defunct sports teams in North Carolina
Carolina Diamonds
Women's sports in North Carolina
Women's sports in Tennessee